Oare Mill is a Grade II listed  house converted Tower mill in Oare, Kent, England that was built in the late eighteenth or early nineteenth century.

History

Oare mill was built in the late eighteenth or early nineteenth century. It was marked on the 1819–42 Ordnance Survey map and Greenwood's map of 1821. The mill was working until June 1919. There was a steam engine, the boiler of which once exploded and damaged the Mill Cottages and Windmill Inn. Photographs show that the cap was still on the mill in 1952, but the roof had gone by 1963. In that year the derelict mill was converted into a house, retaining some machinery. A new domed polygonal roof fitted to replace the original cap.

Description

Oare Mill is a five-storey tower mill with a stage at first-floor level. It formerly had four single patent sails carried on a cast-iron windshaft, and a Kentish-style cap. The mill was winded by a fantail. It drove four pairs of millstones  overdrift. The wallower remains, mounted at the top of the Upright Shaft, which is wooden and  square. The Great Spur Wheel also remains.

Millers

Elliott - 1819
Thomas K Hope
Robert Shrubsole
Kennett 1841
F Inge
H W Elliott 1862
Thomas K Hope 1878
B Filmer
Herbert Filmer 1882–1886
F Ralph 1891
Herbert Filmer Sep 1917 – Jun 1919
References for above:-

References

External links
Windmill World page on the mill.

Buildings and structures completed in the 19th century
Windmills in Kent
Grinding mills in the United Kingdom
Tower mills in the United Kingdom
Grade II listed buildings in Kent